Tulu Brahmins or Tuluva Brahmins are the  inhabitants of Tulu Nadu, also considered a part of Parashurama Kshetra which extends to Kerala.

They consist of following:
Sthanika Brahmins
Havyaka Brahmins
Sakalpuri Havyaka Brahmins
Nambudri Brahmins
Shivalli Brahmins
Chitpavan Brahmins
Karhade Brahmins
Kota Brahmins
Koteshwara Brahmins
Deshastha Brahmins
Padarthi Brahmins

Brahmin communities of Karnataka
Brahmin communities of Kerala

References